Dog Fashion Disco is an American heavy metal band from Rockville, Maryland, that was originally active from 1995 to 2007 before disbanding. The band officially reunited on October 10, 2013.

History

Early years (1995–2000)
Dog Fashion Disco, or DFD as many fans refer to them as, was formed in 1995 by Todd Smith, Greg Combs, and John Ensminger, who all went to high school together. Originally their name was Hug The Retard, but this was changed name to Dog Fashion Disco before releasing any material, as they felt the name Hug The Retard was too offensive and might cost them fans. Their first two releases were self-released and low budget products. The first – Erotic Massage – was funded by a loan taken out by drummer John Ensminger, which his father had to co-sign on and "took nearly a year of local shows to pay off the part of the loan that was used for studio time, printing and pressing" and was released independently by the band in 1997. The second self-released album was titled Experiments In Alchemy and released in 1998. Experiments saw more heavy metal numbers, as opposed to the more ballady feel on many of Massage's songs. That same year, DFD signed with Outerloop Records and released The Embryo's in Bloom. The studio quality of the album is noticeably better than its predecessors, and the band was very pleased with the resulted sound. It was then that their management by Maryland resident Derek J. Brewer began and lasted until they disbanded. Polkadot Cadaver is now also managed by Derek J. Brewer under Outerloop Management. In late 1998, Jeff Siegel would join the band as the keyboard player, replacing Sennen Quigley. This lineup would be the longest lasting lineup and stay intact for over 4 years.

Rising popularity and personnel changes (2000–2004)
In 2000, DFD played on USA Network's FarmClub. The exposure DFD received from the show lead them to signing with Spitfire Records.

With the release of their major label debut Anarchists of Good Taste in 2001 on Spitfire Records, DFD saw much wider popularity and distribution of their music than ever before, and recorded a track with System of a Down front-man, Serj Tankian providing vocals, "Mushroom Cult" on the Anarchists album. This song is often wrongly attributed to System of a Down, although Serj Tankian was the only member of System of a Down to perform on the track. The band shot their first music video for the song "Leper Friend," and embarked on their first UK tour in support of the album. DFD also toured with the likes of Mindless Self Indulgence and Tub Ring through 2002.

In 2003, they released Committed to a Bright Future on Spitfire Records and supported Lacuna Coil on their first U.S. headlining tour. Although the album contains the same lineup as Anarchists, both guitarist Greg Combs and drummer John Ensminger left the band before it was released, the latter being replaced by Mike "Ollie" Oliver before the album was released (and is pictured in the album booklet, as well as being listed as an official member of the band). Ensminger and Combs were credited as performing on the album, though not as band members. The spot of lead guitar was temporarily filled by Jason Stevens for the Committed tour, during which bassist and original member Stephen Mears left the band to join the Navy. Mears was replaced by Brian White, and after the tour, Stevens was replaced by Margret Heater member Jasan Stepp as lead guitarist. This lineup recorded the Day of the Dead EP and the live album The City Is Alive Tonight, released in 2004 and 2005 respectively, and is the band lineup in DFDVD.

Rotten Records, Adultery and hiatus (2005–2007)
 
After a short period of off-time in the first half of 2005 (in which The Alter Boys sole album was made and released), Oliver quit the band. Shortly after, DFD's contract with Artemis was ended, and DFD were signed to Rotten Records. On April 4, 2006, they released their sixth studio album, Adultery, which featured the return of original drummer John Ensminger. Their CD release party was held at Peabody's in Cleveland on the April 6 with Tub Ring. The band toured in support for the release of Adultery along with Tub Ring during the summer of 2006, in which keyboardist Tim Swanson temporarily replaced Jeff Siegel. Many of the shows took place in smaller venues (with subsequently smaller audiences) than their tours while signed to Spitfire and Artemis, and, according to Jasan Stepp, resulted in low morale among the band.

On December 5, 2006, Todd Smith Dog posted a blog entry on Dog Fashion Disco's official MySpace stating that the band had decided to call it quits. They performed their farewell show at the Sonar Lounge in Baltimore, Maryland on January 13, 2007, to a capacity crowd, with fans coming from as far away as the United Kingdom. The band played a marathon 25+ song set, ending with the crowd-favorite "Albino Rhino" from the 1998 Experiments in Alchemy album (this was a common concert-closer), and played the song "Sweet Insanity" from their newest album, Adultery, for an encore song. Other past band members including Sennan Quigley and Mike "Ollie" Oliver attended to show support for their former musical family.  The show was opened by the band Oddzar. The event was recorded and then released on the DVD DFDVD II by Rotten Records on October 28, 2008.

Post-disbandment bands

Polkadot Cadaver

On April 17, 2007, a bulletin was posted on the Dog Fashion Disco MySpace page, announcing a new project, Polkadot Cadaver, which is stylistically similar to Dog Fashion Disco. The project features Todd Smith, Jasan Stepp and John Ensminger. The project's MySpace page has four songs and an album (Purgatory Dance Party) which was released on the week of November 17, 2007, for pre-orders and had a street date of November 27, 2007.

They released their second album, Sex Offender on May 10, 2011. Their third album (and first on their own record label Razor to Wrist Records), titled Last Call in Jonestown, was released on May 14, 2013.

Knives Out!

In late 2008, Todd Smith and Jasan Stepp teamed up with members of Nothingface as well as Hellyeah to form Knives Out!. They released their debut album, Black Mass Hysteria, on February 14, 2012. Their follow-up album, Left in the Lurch, was released on August 19, 2016.

El-Creepo!
In 2010, Smith released his first solo album titled El-Creepo! under this moniker. He released his second album under the El-Creepo! name, entitled Aloha, in 2012, and the third Bellissimo! on January 1, 2016.

Celebrity Sex Scandal

In 2012, ex-guitarist Greg Combs's new band Celebrity Sex Scandal released their first single "Ode to Katy Perry". Their full-length debut, entitled Derivative, was released in February 2013. In 2015 Celebrity Sex Scandal released their second album Integral.

Other projects
Todd Smith, Matt Rippetoe and Jeff Siegel are members of The Alter Boys since 2005, although Todd Smith has stated that The Alter Boys will not release any new material.

Tim Swanson has since formed the band Ideamen. The band released an EP titled Progress in 2007 Their full-length debut studio album, May You Live in Interesting Times, was released in 2009 on Rotten Records and their second full-length album Schemata, was released in 2014.  Matt Rippetoe released a solo record, BOINK in 2007, and formed a side project, Willamette, who released their self-titled debut in 2012.

Reunion (2013–present)
The group reunited four times after breaking up before reforming as an active band again in 2013.

2008
They first reunited on September 12, 2008, for the release of DFDVD II and their compilation Beating a Dead Horse to Death... Again. The show featured Stephen Mears on bass for the first time in nearly 5 years.

2010
The second reunion (and first with the final lineup) took place on April 17, 2010, at The Ottobar. The show was opened by Smith and Stepp's side projects Polkadot Cadaver and Knives Out!

2011: Anarchist and Adultery shows
They reunited once more on June 24 and 25, 2011 for the tenth and fifth anniversary of their albums Anarchists of Good Taste and  Adultery, respectively. At the second show, Dog Fashion Disco announced that they will be releasing an acoustic album. Attendees of the reunion shows with VIP passes were provided with a code that allowed them to download an acoustic version of their song "Sweet Insanity." it was also announced that the concert series are to be released on DVD sometime in the future. However, these DVD and acoustic plans have been postponed, and their fate is uncertain.

2013: Committed shows and reformation
The most recent reunion was a two-night set of shows that took place on May 31 and June 1, 2013, at Baltimore Sound Stage, featuring the Adultery lineup like the previous two reunions. These Shows were preceded by an El-Creepo! "warm up" show at The Ottobar on May 30, which included drummers John Ensminger and Scott Radway, as well as Jasan Stepp. The first night of the reunion featured original guitarist Greg Combs on stage with DFD for the first time in over 10 years. At the second show, Smith announced plans for a new album, with the title "Sweet Nothings". On October 10, 2013, a status update via the Polkadot Cadaver Facebook page confirmed that Dog Fashion Disco is officially back together as a band. The line-up is the same as the previous three reunion line-ups, however, Tim Swanson will replace Jeff Siegel on keyboards once again. It was then announced that Mike Oliver would be playing drums on the summer tour of 2014.

2014
The first album from DFD in eight years, Sweet Nothings, was released on July 22, 2014, after being funded through Indiegogo. Due to the success from their Indiegogo campaign, in 2015 the band announced that they will be releasing a follow up album entitled 'Ad Nauseum'. They also announced three nights in London, England, for September 2014, and the success of those sell-out dates prompted a UK tour with Psychostick in 2015. The album was released on October 2, 2015.

2017–present
The band began releasing re-recorded versions of their earlier albums, in order to reclaim the rights to the music from their former record labels. The first of these was Erotic Massage, which was released on May 19, 2017. This was followed up by another re-recorded album, Experiments in Embryos, released on July 6, 2018. The third album, Anarchists of Good Taste, was released on December 7, 2018, and the last of the re-records, Committed to a Bright Future, was released on June 28, 2019.

The Adultery novelization
Moonlight City Drive, a novelization of DFD's 2006 concept album Adultery was written by Brian Paone and published in November 2017.

Musical style
The German music magazine Rock Hard wrote in their review of the band's album Anarchists of Good Taste that "The combo makes it clear right from the first track, 'Leper Friend', that it's more than just another nu metal band with a weird outfit and bizarre lyrics". Sputnikmusic said that "Dog Fashion Disco have always been difficult to pin down. Combining such potentially dissimilar genres as alternative metal, funk and cabaret, the collective made a name for themselves with their unique crossover style." Blabbermouth said in a review of the band's album Adultery that Dog Fashion Disco "is genre-less and proud of it"; the band's style was described as a "blend of strangely accessible hard rock, metal, punk, jazz [and] ska". AllMusic said that "Dog Fashion Disco, with their crunching guitar chords, swirling lead guitars, warped organs, and evil vocals, à la any thrash metal band U.S.A., sound like the musical equivalent of death" and that on the album Anarchists of Good Taste, the band "seems to be in a contest to see whether they can outwarp the likes of Marilyn Manson". The website classified Dog Fashion Disco as an alternative metal band, while The Baltimore Sun categorized the band as progressive metal, PopMatters called the band's music a blend of "evil circus music" and rock, and The PRP classified them as avant-garde metal. The band members themselves have cited their collective influences as being Mike Patton and his bands Mr. Bungle and Faith No More, as well as Clutch, Tool, System of a Down and Frank Zappa.

Members

Current lineup
Todd Smith — vocals (1995–2007, 2013–present); Reunions 2008, 2010, 2011, and 2013
Jasan Stepp — guitars (2003–2007, 2013–present); Reunions 2008, 2010, 2011, and 2013
Brian "Wendy" White — bass guitar (2003–2007, 2013–present); Reunions 2010, 2011, and 2013
Tim Swanson — keyboards (2006; 2013–present)
John Ensminger — drums (1995–2003; 2006–2007, 2013–present); Reunions 2008, 2010, 2011, and 2013
Matt Rippetoe — saxophones and woodwinds (2013–present session player 2001–2006); Reunions 2011 and 2013

Previous members
Greg Combs — guitars (1995–2003); Reunion 2013
Stephen Mears aka "Grand Master Super Eagle Sultan" — bass guitar (1996–1998; 1998–2003); Reunion 2008
Jeff Siegel — keyboards (1998–2006; 2006–2007); Reunions 2008, 2010, 2011, and 2013
Mike "Ollie" Oliver — drums (2003–2005), (2014–2015) (Live)
Sennen Quigley — guitars, keyboards (1997–1998)
Mark Ammen — bass guitar (1998)
Rob Queen — drums (2015 (Live))
Jason Stevens — guitar (2003)
Geoff Stewart — alto/tenor/bari saxophone (1997–1998)
Kristen Ensminger — trumpet (1997–1998)
Dane Robinson - Vocals, guitars (2008-2013)
Josh Gifford — trumpet (1996–1997)
Dave Sislen — saxophone (1996–1997)
Ken Willard — bass guitar (1995)

Timeline

Discography

Studio albums

Compilation albums

Live albums

EPs

Music videos

DVDs

References

External links

Rotten Records website
Dog Fashion Disco on Facebook

Unstable Ground (DFD video/DVD producers)
Working Class Rock Star (documentary inspired by DFD)

American alternative metal musical groups
American avant-garde metal musical groups
American progressive metal musical groups
Heavy metal musical groups from Maryland
Musical groups established in 1995
1995 establishments in Maryland
Musical groups disestablished in 2007
Musical groups reestablished in 2013